Pipradrol (Meratran) is a mild central nervous system stimulant (norepinephrine-dopamine reuptake inhibitor) that is no longer widely used in most countries due to concerns about its abuse potential. Pipradrol is still used in some European countries and in the United States, albeit rarely.

History
Pipradrol was patented in 1949, and found use initially for treating obesity. It was subsequently used for the treatment of a variety of other conditions such as narcolepsy, ADHD, and most particularly for counteracting the symptoms of senile dementia, this being the only application for which it is still used medically. Pipradrol proved useful for these applications as its relatively mild stimulant effects gave it a good safety profile compared to stronger stimulants. It was also studied as an adjutant treatment for depression and schizophrenia although it was never widely used for these purposes.

Pipradrol was made illegal in many countries in the late 1970s, at the same time as many other drugs which had a history of abuse. The relatively mild stimulant effects of pipradrol meant that it was scheduled under the less restrictive classes in most countries (i.e. Class C in United Kingdom and New Zealand) but was still considered of sufficient abuse potential to be made an illegal drug. It is now an obscure compound that is virtually unknown as an illicit drug of abuse, but is still used for some scientific research, often as a comparison drug for testing other stimulants against.

Dose
Dosage is between 0.5 and 4 milligrams per day, typically taken as a single dose in the morning as the long duration of effects of pipradrol (up to 12 hours) means insomnia can be a problem especially if it is used at higher doses or taken too late in the day.

Side effects

Common side effects include insomnia, anorexia, tachycardia, and anxiety. Rarer side effects include dry mouth, tremor, hypertension, euphoria, depression, and very rarely psychosis or convulsions.

References

Tertiary alcohols
Stimulants
Norepinephrine–dopamine reuptake inhibitors
2-Piperidinyl compounds
Phenylethanolamines
Benzhydryl compounds